Benjamin Simmons may refer to:

 Ben Simmons (born 1996), Australian basketball player
 Benjamin Stanley Simmons or B. Stanley Simmons (1871–1931), American architect. 
 Benjamin Taylor Simmons (1871–1933), American general

See also
Benjamin Simons, British theoretical physicist
Ben Simons (disambiguation)